Qashoqtarash Mahalleh (also Romanized as Qāshoqtarāsh Maḩalleh; also known as Qāshoqtarāsh) is a village in Baladeh Rural District, Khorramabad District, Tonekabon County, Mazandaran Province, Iran. At the time of the 2006 census, the village was home to 105 families and its population size was 374.

References 

Populated places in Tonekabon County